Ophis was a town of ancient Pontus on the Black Sea near the mouth of the Ophis River, 90 stadia east of Hyssus.

Its site is located near Of in Asiatic Turkey.

References

Populated places in ancient Pontus
Former populated places in Turkey
History of Trabzon Province